The following Union Army units and commanders fought in the Battle of Chaffin's Farm of the American Civil War. The Confederate order of battle is shown separately.

Abbreviations used

Military rank
 MG = Major General
 BG = Brigadier General
 Col = Colonel
 Ltc = Lieutenant Colonel
 Maj = Major

Other
 w = wounded
 k = killed

Army of the James

MG Benjamin F. Butler

 Chief of Engineers: BG Godfrey Weitzel

X Corps

MG David B. Birney

XVIII Corps

MG Edward O. C. Ord (w) September 29
BG Charles A. Heckman
BG Godfrey Weitzel

Cavalry

Notes

Sources
 Composition is taken from the Official Records
 Eicher, John H., and Eicher, David J., Civil War High Commands, Stanford University Press, 2001, .

American Civil War orders of battle